Gabriel Santos may refer to:

 Gabriel Joaquim dos Santos (1892-1985), Brazilian salt worker and architect
 Gabriel Santos (footballer, born 1983), Brazilian football centre-back
 Gabriel Santos (swimmer) (born 1996), Brazilian swimmer
 Gabriel Santos (footballer, born 1999), Brazilian football forward